The Australian Open, owned and run by Golf Australia, is the oldest and most prestigious golf tournament on the PGA Tour of Australasia. The Open was first played in 1904 and takes place toward the end of each year.

The winner of the tournament receives the Stonehaven Cup, presented by Lord Stonehaven, the Governor-General of Australia from 1925 to 1930. It was first presented in 1930.

Status
The Australian Open was the flagship tournament of the PGA Tour of Australasia from 1992 to 2019. It had a special status in the Official World Golf Ranking's points system, awarding a minimum 32 points to the winner regardless of the strength of the field.

The tournament was part of the OneAsia Tour from 2009 to 2016. The 2022 edition was co-sanctioned by the European Tour.

Since the Open Qualifying Series was introduced for the 2014 Open Championship, the Australian Open has been the first of a number of qualifying tournaments, giving up to three non-exempt players entry into the Open Championship.

History
The Australian Golf Union was formed in 1898 and from 1899 organised a championship meeting. From 1899 to 1902 this included the Australian Amateur championship contested over 72 holes of stroke play. In 1903 the format was revised, there being a 36-hole stroke-play stage after which the leading 8 played match-play with a 36-hole final. The 1904 championship meeting was held at The Australian Golf Club. In 1903, the club had hosted the New South Wales Amateur and had run the 36-hole stroke-play qualifying stage as an open event, with professionals as well as amateurs competing. The idea was used at the 1904 championship meeting. There was a 72-hole stroke-play event open to professionals, played over two days, after which the leading 16 amateurs competed for the amateur championship. The stroke-play event became the first Australian Open and was won by an English amateur, Michael Scott, with a score of 315. Two more amateurs Leslie Penfold Hyland and Dan Soutar finished second and third, while Carnegie Clark was the leading professional, tied for fourth place.

The 1905 championship meeting was played at Royal Melbourne and the open and amateur championship were decided by the same 72-hole tournament. Dan Soutar, now a professional, won the open with Michael Scott second, 10 strokes behind. As the leading amateur, Scott won the amateur championship. The 1906 open was won by Carnegie Clark, 5 ahead of Soutar. Soutar was to be runner-up in five successive opens, from 1906 to 1910. In 1907 Scott repeated his success of 1904, and further amateur wins came in the following two years, Clyde Pearce winning in 1908 and Claude Felstead in 1909. The 1910 open was held in South Australia for the first time and resulted in a second win for Clark, with a record score of 306, 11 strokes ahead of Soutar. Clark won for the third time the following year, although only by a single shot from Fred Popplewell. The 1912 open was won by an 18-year-old amateur, Ivo Whitton, 5 ahead of Popplewell and Soutar. Whitton won again the following year with a new record score of 302. Another amateur Audley Lemprière came second with Soutar third, a distant 15 strokes behind Whitton.

The open restarted in 1920 and was won by Joe Kirkwood Sr. with a score of 290, 12 strokes better than the previous record score. Dan Soutar was second, 5 shots behind, the seventh time he had been runner-up. Five of the nine opens between 1924 and 1932 were won by amateurs. In 1924 Alex Russell led from the start after an opening round of 68 and, with further rounds of 79, 78 and 78, won by two strokes from Carnegie Clark. Ivo Whitton won in 1926, 13 years after his last win, and won again in 1929 and 1931. Mick Ryan won in 1932, the third successive amateur winner at Royal Adelaide. Of the professionals, Fred Popplewell won twice, in 1925 and 1928, while Rufus Stewart won in 1927 and was runner-up in the other four opens between 1926 and 1930. 1928 was the first Open played over 3 days, with 36 holes on the final day. There was a cut after 36 holes with the leading 60 and ties playing on the final day. With the leading 16 amateurs in the Open qualifying for the match play stage of the amateur championship, there was also a proviso that at least 24 amateurs should make the cut.  The 1930 open was the first to be held at the Metropolitan Golf Club and the winner, Frank Eyre, was the first to be presented with the Stonehaven Cup.

1931 saw the emergence of 16-year-old Jim Ferrier. Needing 5 at the last hole to tie Ivo Whitton, he took 6 and finished runner-up. He was also a runner-up in 1933 and 1935. He had another good change to win in 1935 but took 7 at the 71st hole and again finished a stroke behind the winner. He didn't win the open until 1938, when he won by a record 14 strokes from Norman Von Nida. He repeated his success in 1939. 1934 saw the first serious American challenger when Gene Sarazen played in the event. He was on a world tour with Joe Kirkwood Jr. However Billy Bolger won the open with a new record score of 283, with Sarazen second and Kirkwood fourth. Sarazen returned in 1936 and won with a score of 282, a new record.

The championship resumed in 1946 at Royal Sydney and was won by Ossie Pickworth, who finished two ahead of the amateur Alan Waterson. The Australian Amateur was also played at Royal Sydney, starting the following week. However, the Open no longer acted as a qualifying event for the amateur championship, which became match-play only. 1947 was the first year that the open and amateur were played at different venues, Royal Queensland hosting the open for the first time. It was also the first time it had been played as early as June.  Billy McWilliam scored 65 in the first round and took an 8 stroke lead. He still led by 4 at the start of the final round but took 78, while Pickworth scored 69 to retain his title by 5 shots. From 1947 it was generally the case that the Open and the Amateur were played at separate venues. This naturally tended to reduce the number of amateurs playing in the open, since they no longer had to play it to qualify for the amateur championship. 1948 saw the first appearance of Jim Ferrier since 1939, creating much public interest in the event. Pickworth and Ferrier tied on 289, resulting in the first open playoff. Pickworth won the 18 hole playoff with a score of 71 to Ferrier's 74, to win his third successive title. Pickworth seemed likely to win his fourth title in 1949 as he led by 6 strokes after 3 rounds. However, Eric Cremin had a last round of 68 to Pickworth's 80 to win the title. Pickworth was later disqualified for recording an incorrect score at his final hole, so that Norman Von Nida, playing in his first open since 1939, became the runner-up.

Norman Von Nida was the leading player of the early-1950s, winning the open in 1950, 1952 and 1953 and being a runner-up in the other four opens between 1949 and 1955. Peter Thomson won in 1951 while Ossie Pickworth took his fourth title in 1954. 1952 was the first open held in Western Australia, being played at Lake Karrinyup. Von Nida won with a record score of 278. Von Nida equalled that record in 1953 and also equalled the record for the lowest round, with his final 65. Bobby Locke won in 1955, the first overseas winner since 1936. This was played at Gailes, near Brisbane, in late May, the earliest of any open. Kel Nagle seems a likely winner in 1956 but finished badly, for a final round 76, while Bruce Crampton finished with two birdies for a 68 and won by two strokes.

Gary Player made his first appearance in 1957, and would eventually win the title 7 times. He seemed a likely winner on his debut, but in the final round took 7 at the 13th and 6 at the 16th and lost by a stroke from Frank Phillips. Player returned in 1958, winning by 5 strokes. Kel Nagle had been close to winning a number of times and won his only open in 1959. The 1960 open was held at Lake Karrinyup for the second time, a week after the amateur championship. Bruce Devlin, still an amateur, won his only open. Amateurs took 8 of the first 9 places. Player returned in 1961 but only finished tied for third, Phillips winning by two strokes from Nagle. Player won in 1962, by two strokes from Nagle. Jack Nicklaus made his debut in 1962, finishing 5th. Player won again in 1963, his third win, by 5 shots from Bruce Devlin. Devlin came close to winning in 1964. Needing a par-5 at the 72nd hole he took 6, and then lost to Jack Nicklaus by 3 strokes in an 18-hole playoff. The playoff was played on a Sunday, the first Sunday play in the open's history. Player won his fourth title in 1965, setting a new record score of 264, despite taking a bogey-5 at the final hole. Player started with a record round of 62 and had another 62 in the third round. Nicklaus and Phillips tied for second place, 6 behind Player.

The 1966 open was the first to be held over four days and the first to finish on a Sunday. Arnold Palmer made his debut in the event and won by 5 strokes from Kel Nagle. Peter Thomson won his second open in 1967, the first Australian winner since 1961. He won by 7 strokes from Col Johnston. Jack Nicklaus won for the second time in 1968, beating Gary Player by a stroke after making a birdie-3 at the final hole. The 1968 open was sponsored by a local TV company, the first open to be sponsored. From 1969 the event was sponsored by Qantas. In difficult conditions, Player had a final round 77, but still won his 5th title in 1969, equalling Ivo Whitton's record. In 1970 Player led by 8 strokes after three rounds and, despite a last round 74, won by 3, for his 6th win in the event. In 1971 the open was held in Tasmania for the only time, at Royal Hobart. Nicklaus had a 9-stroke lead after three rounds and won by 8 shots. In 1972 there was an 18-hole playoff after a tie between Peter Thomson and David Graham. Graham drove out-of-bounds at the first hole and Thomson took a three-stroke lead after making a birdie. Thomson eventually won by 6 strokes for his third title. J. C. Snead won in 1973, by two strokes from Jerry Breaux, a little-known American. In 1974 Player won his 7th title. Leading by 5 strokes at the start of the final round, he scored 73 and won by 3.

From 1975 to 1978 the open was held at The Australian Golf Club. Kerry Packer had funded a redesign of the course by Jack Nicklaus. The event was broadcast through Packer's Channel Nine network. He also financed a large increase in the prize money. Nicklaus won three of the four events, in 1973, 1974 and 1976 while David Graham won in 1975. The 1979 and 1980 events were sponsored by Dunhill but with less prize money than in 1978. Jack Newton won in 1979 with Greg Norman winning in 1980. The 1981 event was multi-sponsored, without a title sponsor, and was won by Bill Rogers, beating Norman by a stroke.

Having not been played in 2020 or 2021 because of the COVID-19 pandemic. The event returned in 2022. It was announced that the 2022 tournament would feature the men's and women's Opens played on the same course at the same time. They would also share a prize fund of US$3,400,000. In addition to this announcement, it was also confirmed that the European Tour would sanction the men's event for the first time.

Venues

Winners

Sources:

Multiple winners
As of the 2019 event, the following golfers have won the Australian Open more than once.

7 wins
Gary Player: 1958, 1962, 1963, 1965, 1969, 1970, 1974

6 wins
Jack Nicklaus: 1964, 1968, 1971, 1975, 1976, 1978

5 wins
Greg Norman: 1980, 1985, 1987, 1995, 1996
Ivo Whitton: 1912, 1913, 1926, 1929, 1931 (amateur)

4 wins
Ossie Pickworth: 1946, 1947, 1948, 1954

3 wins
Peter Thomson: 1951, 1967, 1972
Norman Von Nida: 1950, 1952, 1953
Carnegie Clark: 1906, 1910, 1911

2 wins
Matt Jones: 2015, 2019
Jordan Spieth: 2014, 2016
Peter Senior: 1989, 2012
Greg Chalmers: 1998, 2011
Robert Allenby: 1994, 2005
Peter Lonard: 2003, 2004
Aaron Baddeley: 1999, 2000 (first win as amateur)
Frank Phillips: 1957, 1961
Jim Ferrier: 1938, 1939 (both as an amateur)
Fred Popplewell: 1925, 1929
Michael Scott: 1904, 1907 (amateur)

See also
 Women's Australian Open
 Australian Amateur
 Australian Boys' Amateur

Notes

References

External links

Coverage on the PGA Tour of Australasia official site
Coverage on the European Tour's official site

PGA Tour of Australasia events
European Tour events
Golf tournaments in Australia
1904 establishments in Australia
Recurring sporting events established in 1904
The Emirates Group